The first manager of Chelsea Football Club was John Robertson, appointed player-manager in 1905. The current head coach is Graham Potter, who was appointed in September 2022.

Chelsea have had 29 permanent managers/head coaches (of whom four also served as player-manager), six interim managers and five caretakers. Ron Suart has served as both caretaker and interim manager. Roberto Di Matteo was first interim manager, but was later appointed permanent manager. Guus Hiddink has been interim manager twice, while José Mourinho has served two different periods as permanent manager.

Chelsea's first ever manager was Scottish wing-half John Tait Robertson, who continued to play for the club until he resigned a year later. David Calderhead is Chelsea's longest-serving manager, holding the position from 1907 to 1933, spanning 966 matches. Chelsea's shortest reigning permanent manager is Danny Blanchflower, who was in charge for 32 games. Statistically, Chelsea's least successful manager is also Blanchflower.

The first manager under whom Chelsea won a major trophy was Ted Drake, who guided the club to the league championship in the 1954–55 season. Drake led Chelsea to its first league title in 1955, while Dave Sexton managed the club to their first European honour, a UEFA Cup Winners' Cup triumph in 1971, and Gianluca Vialli guided Chelsea to win the 1998 UEFA Super Cup.

Mourinho has won the most domestic titles, whereas Ancelotti led Chelsea to their first league and FA Cup "Double". Di Matteo won the first UEFA Champions League for Chelsea in 2012. A year after, Benítez led the club to win the UEFA Europa League, becoming the first club to hold two major European titles simultaneously and one of five clubs, and the first British club, to have won all three of UEFA's major club competitions.

List of managers
Figures correct as of 18 February 2023. Includes competitive matches only.
This list of all managers includes performance records and honours.
M = Matches played; W = Matches won; D = Matches drawn; L = Matches lost; GF = Goals for; GA = Goals against

Managers with honours

Notes

Footnotes

 
Chelsea
Managers